Dicronychus is a genus of click beetle belonging to the family Elateridae.

Species
 Dicronychus abyssinus (Candèze, 1889)
 Dicronychus adanensis (Pic, 1908)
 Dicronychus aenescens Platia & Gudenzi, 2003
 Dicronychus alternatus Schwarz, 1906
 Dicronychus annamensis Fleutiaux, 1931
 Dicronychus antsiranus Fleutiaux, 1933
 Dicronychus apteriformis Platia & Gudenzi, 2004
 Dicronychus asiaticus Fleutiaux, 1931
 Dicronychus asperulus (Candèze, 1860)
 Dicronychus bactrianus (Gurjeva, 1966)
 Dicronychus beauchenei Fleutiaux, 1918
 Dicronychus berrai Platia & Gudenzi, 2003
 Dicronychus bicolor Platia & Gudenzi, 2004
 Dicronychus bicolor Leseigneur, 1958
 Dicronychus blandus Solsky, 1881
 Dicronychus bozdagensis Platia & Gudenzi, 2004
 Dicronychus brancuccii Platia & Schimmel, 1997
 Dicronychus brullei Platia & Gudenzi, 2003
 Dicronychus buettikeri Platia & Schimmel, 1997
 Dicronychus bureschi (Roubal, 1936)
 Dicronychus campadellii Platia & Gudenzi, 2003
 Dicronychus candezei Dumont
 Dicronychus chassaini Platia & Schimmel, 1997
 Dicronychus cinereus (Herbst, 1784)
 Dicronychus conductus (Erichson, 1840)
 Dicronychus confusus Fleutiaux, 1918
 Dicronychus consentaneus (Kollar, 1848)
 Dicronychus crassipes Schwarz
 Dicronychus crassus Fleutiaux, 1932
 Dicronychus cruentipennis Candèze
 Dicronychus dahuricus (Candèze, 1889)
 Dicronychus davidianus (Candèze, 1882)
 Dicronychus decorus (Faldermann, 1835)
 Dicronychus deminutus Platia & Gudenzi, 2004
 Dicronychus dentatus Fleutiaux, 1931
 Dicronychus desbrochersi Platia & Gudenzi, 2004
 Dicronychus devius (Candèze, 1882)
 Dicronychus drurei (Pic, 1908)
 Dicronychus duporti Fleutiaux, 1931
 Dicronychus equiseti (Herbst, 1784)
 Dicronychus equisetioides Lohse, 1976
 Dicronychus exstinctus (Erichson, 1840)
 Dicronychus extractus Fleutiaux, 1931
 Dicronychus falsus Fleutiaux, 1931
 Dicronychus ferrugineus Schwarz
 Dicronychus ferruginosus Platia & Schimmel, 1997
 Dicronychus foveifrons Fairmaire
 Dicronychus freudei Platia & Gudenzi, 2007
 Dicronychus fulvivellus (Candèze, 1860)
 Dicronychus fusivittatus Platia & Gudenzi, 1999
 Dicronychus gedyei Fleutiaux, 1935
 Dicronychus gillerforsi Platia & Gudenzi, 2004
 Dicronychus graingeri Platia & Schimmel, 1997
 Dicronychus grandicollis Fleutiaux, 1935
 Dicronychus granulatus Candèze, 1882
 Dicronychus haematomus Candèze, 1860
 Dicronychus hedenborgii (Candèze, 1860)
 Dicronychus hippanicus (Orlov, 1997)
 Dicronychus hoberlandti Cate, Platia & Schimmel, 2002
 Dicronychus hunti Fleutiaux, 1935
 Dicronychus iconiensis (Pic, 1908)
 Dicronychus illustratus Fleutiaux, 1932
 Dicronychus incanus (Erichson, 1840)
 Dicronychus incostatus Fleutiaux, 1931
 Dicronychus intermedius Platia & Gudenzi, 2003
 Dicronychus involucer Platia & Gudenzi, 2004
 Dicronychus javaneus (Candèze, 1860)
 Dicronychus lactho Fleutiaux, 1940
 Dicronychus larseni Platia & Schimmel, 1997
 Dicronychus latescapulatus (Buysson, 1906)
 Dicronychus littoralis Fleutiaux, 1935
 Dicronychus luciae Laibner, 1985
 Dicronychus macedonicus Platia & Gudenzi, 2003
 Dicronychus maculipennis Fleutiaux, 1918
 Dicronychus mandibularis Candèze, 1882
 Dicronychus marani (Roubal, 1936)
 Dicronychus marginalis (Candèze, 1860)
 Dicronychus martini Platia & Gudenzi, 2003
 Dicronychus mauritanicus (Motschulsky, 1858)
 Dicronychus merkli (Pic, 1910)
 Dicronychus mesopotamicus Platia & Gudenzi, 1999
 Dicronychus militaris Fleutiaux, 1935
 Dicronychus mixtus (Fleutiaux, 1931)
 Dicronychus mossulensis (Pic, 1912)
 Dicronychus mutilus Platia & Gudenzi, 2004
 Dicronychus nebulosus (Motschulsky, 1858)
 Dicronychus nigripennis Fleutiaux, 1933
 Dicronychus nigropunctatus (Motschulsky, 1860)
 Dicronychus obesus (Krynicki, 1832)
 Dicronychus obscuripennis (Pic, 1899)
 Dicronychus omanensis Platia & Schimmel, 1997
 Dicronychus paleatus (Candèze, 1893)
 Dicronychus pallidus Laurent, 1974
 Dicronychus perrieri Fleutiaux, 1933
 Dicronychus perstriatus (Buysson, 1912)
 Dicronychus pici Platia & Gudenzi, 2004
 Dicronychus plumosus Candèze
 Dicronychus psephoides Candèze, 1893
 Dicronychus pseudobesus (Orlov, 1993)
 Dicronychus pseudofebriens Buysson, 1912
 Dicronychus puerulus (Candèze, 1889)
 Dicronychus quadrinaevus Reitter, 1891
 Dicronychus rejafus Fleutiaux, 1935
 Dicronychus rubripennis Fleutiaux, 1935
 Dicronychus rubripes (Germar, 1824)
 Dicronychus rufus Fleutiaux, 1919
 Dicronychus sahlbergi Schwarz, 1900
 Dicronychus schmalfussi Chassain, 1984
 Dicronychus scobis Vats, 1984
 Dicronychus seclusus Fleutiaux, 1935
 Dicronychus senaci (Desbrochers des Loges, 1869)
 Dicronychus separatus Fleutiaux, 1931
 Dicronychus septentrionalis (Fleutiaux, 1931)
 Dicronychus similis Fleutiaux, 1918
 Dicronychus soalalanus Fleutiaux, 1933
 Dicronychus spernendus (Candèze, 1875)
 Dicronychus stolatus Erichson, 1840
 Dicronychus submontanus Vats, 1984
 Dicronychus subparallelus Fleutiaux, 1931
 Dicronychus subulipennis Faldermann, 1835
 Dicronychus talhouki Platia & Schimmel, 1997
 Dicronychus tangensis Fleutiaux
 Dicronychus triangulus Fleutiaux, 1933
 Dicronychus tritus Candèze, 1882
 Dicronychus turcicus Platia & Gudenzi, 2004
 Dicronychus turkmenicus Platia & Gudenzi, 2007
 Dicronychus uniformis Fleutiaux
 Dicronychus vagus Candèze, 1888
 Dicronychus variatus (Desbroches des Loges, 1875)
 Dicronychus variolosus Fleutiaux, 1935
 Dicronychus vaulogeri Fleutiaux, 1931
 Dicronychus versicolor (Mulsant & Guillebeau, 1856)
 Dicronychus wagneri (Pecírka, 1926)
 Dicronychus wittmeri Platia & Schimmel, 1997

References 

 Biolib
 SYNOPSIS OF THE DESCRIBED COLEOPTERA OF THE WORLD

Elateridae genera